is an anime television series produced by Telecable Benelux B.V., that is based on the Moomin novels and comic strips by the Finnish illustrator and author Tove Jansson and her brother Lars Jansson. The anime series premiered on TV Tokyo on April 12, 1990 and ended on October 3, 1991 with 78 episodes being made. Because of its huge success in Japan, the sequel series, entitled  was made and first aired from October 10, 1991 to March 26, 1992, lasting 26 episodes. The sequel series has only been aired in certain countries outside Japan, where it is featured as the second season of Moomin, combining two series resulting in 104 episodes in total. Unlike the original series, the sequel series doesn't have any episodes based on Tove Jansson's books. However, part of its episodes are based on Lars Jansson's comic strips, the sequel series doesn't have a narration either, like in the original series.

In certain countries like Finland and Sweden, several episodes from the combined list of 104 episodes have been left un-aired. In Finland, episodes "The Pirate", "The Imp" and "The Birthday Surprise" were banned due to being too terrifying and "un-Moomin-like", according to the director of the Finnish dub, Jertta Ratia-Kähönen, while in Sweden, episodes "The Pirate", "The Big Explosion", "The Imp", "Snorkmaiden Goes Psychic", "The Water Nymph", "Moominpappa's Second Youth", "Motherly Love", "The Terrible Little My", "Moomin's the Fortune-Teller", "The Fancy-Dress Ball", "The Vampire", "The Phoenix", "The Slug-a-Bed Mushrooms", "Moomin and the Dolphin" and "The Cave" haven't been aired. In Norway, "The Pirate", "The Big Explosion", "The Imp" and "Snorkmaiden Goes Psychic" were left out when the show was first dubbed, and were therefore not aired. They were first dubbed when the series received a redub for VHS releases (except for "The Imp", which was never dubbed). "The Pirate" was dubbed and released only for rentail VHS, even 3 of the 4 episodes was dubbed for home release, they wasn't aired on TV after then home release dubs was beign aired on TV. All 78 episodes from the first series have been shown on Children's BBC in the United Kingdom, but the sequel series has been completely left out.

In both Norway and Denmark, the show was dubbed twice – one dub for VHS and one for TV. This was presumably due to copyright issues, which was a common phenomenon in the Nordic countries. This is also why the series was redubbed in Finland in 2017.

In the Japanese dub, Moomin uses two pieces of theme music. From episodes 1-52, the opening theme is "Yume no Sekai he" and the closing theme is "Tooi akogare", both of them having the vocals performed by Emiko Shiratori and composed by Sumio Shiratori. From episodes 53-78, the opening theme is "Omajinai no uta" by Ponpin-tai ~Moomin-dani no Nakamatachi~ and the closing theme is "Itsuka suteki na tabi" by Emiko Shiratori. The sequel series' opening theme is "Hesomagarincho" by Ado Mizumori and Tyrone Hashimoto and the ending recycles the "Itsuka suteki na tabi" theme by Emiko Shiratori. In the versions shown outside Japan, these are all replaced by one opening and one ending theme that are both composed by Dutch songmaker Pierre Kartner.

Animation in the opening and ending sequences
 (ep: 1 – 52)
 Animation director : Masateru Kudō
 (ep : 53 – 78)
 Animation director : Sonomi Aramaki
 (ep : 79 – 104)
 Animation director : Rie Nishino

 Ending themes
 (ep : 1 – 52)
 Animation director : Shirō Murata
 (ep : 53 – 104)
 Animation director : Sonomi Aramakii

Episode list

Season 1 (Moomin)

Season 2 (Delightful Moomin Family: Adventure Diary)

References

Moomin (1990 TV series)
Moomin television series